Cloverway Inc. (abbreviated as CWi, also branded as Cloverway) was a media licensing agency based in Long Beach, California which specialized in Japanese animation and manga licensing, and they were best known for being the representative office of Toei Animation for the Americas, mostly distributing Toei properties for syndication and home video. They were also acting as an intermediary agent between Japanese companies (Shueisha, Shogakukan, Nippon Animation, etc.) and local companies both in the U.S. market (Viz Communications, Tokyopop, Pioneer Entertainment, ADV Films, and Bandai Entertainment) and Latin American market (Televisa, TV Azteca, Turner, PlayTV), for film distribution or manga publishing of their contents in the continent, to various TV channels in each country, regionally and pan-regionally as well as arranging publishing deals with several manga publishers in English, Portuguese and Spanish.

History
The company was founded in 1991. In 1992, the first anime series distributed by Cloverway for Latin America was the Knights of the Zodiac TV series, first broadcast in Mexico and Brazil. It was followed by Sailor Moon and Dragon Ball some time later.

In 1995, Dragon Ball was re-dubbed by Cloverway, after Bandai failed distributing their first episodes and a movie, dubbed under the title of "Zero y el Dragón Mágico" ("Zero and the Magic Dragon", based on the Harmony Gold version).

As for the series owned by TMS, Spanish versions were already dubbed by VDI Multimedia in Los Angeles and previously distributed by other companies, but Brazilian versions were never produced and Cloverway couldn't get a deal for them to be dubbed and broadcast in Brazil. Also, Spanish versions of Kimba (Tezuka Productions) and Nippon Animation series distributed by Cloverway, were formerly dubbed and licensed by other companies, so Cloverway just distributed and offered them for reruns or inside TV programming packages.

Parallel in the United States, Cloverway tried to distribute the same series by himself as in Latin America, but due to the regulations that led to the series censorship, they delegated licenses to local distributors who managed the production of English localization, dubbing and distribution. However, Sailor Moon S and Sailor Moon SuperS were the only two licenses whose English versions were produced by Cloverway, dubbed in association with Optimum Production Services in Canada. As for the U.S. Hispanic market, Cloverway syndicated the series Tenchi Universe to Univision (Univision and Telefutura networks) and Dragon Ball Z to Telemundo networks.

When Shueisha became a joint owner of Viz Communications in 2002 and with the subsequent merger with ShoPro in 2005, Cloverway eventually lost the representation of Shueisha (for N.A. and L.A.) and Shogakukan (for L.A.) for publishing licensing in the Americas.

The company's representation of Toei Animation in America ceased, due to Toei's decision to start licensing and distributing directly since 2004, thus ending the contracts with their agents Tokyo Business Consultants in Europe and Cloverway in America, and launching their own offices in 2004 ( based in Paris and Toei Animation Inc. based in Los Angeles). In 2005, the Toei Animation licenses arranged by Cloverway were transferred to Toei Animation Inc. as a requirement, leaving Cloverway only with the catalog of the other Japanese producers they licensed. As a consequence of this, there has been a chain of irregularities, such as the loss of master tapes of many series formerly distributed by Cloverway, with the Latin American versions being the most affected for this change in distribution.

After losing Toei's successful catalog, Cloverway continued representing and distributing anime from other Japanese companies, adding new properties and selling most of their new catalog to Cartoon Network L.A. and other local TV stations in Brazil and Hispanic America. At the middle of 2006, Cloverway licensed an Anime Free-TV programming block titled "Otacraze" to Brazilian broadcaster PlayTV who begun airing the block in March 2007, including the series Ranma ½, Samurai Champloo, Trigun, and Love Hina.

Due to economic problems, Cloverway closed its operations in August 2007.

Licensed titles
The following list features the anime and live action series licensed by the company:

Anime
 The Adventures of Tom Sawyer – Distributor
 Ashita no Nadja – Spanish and Brazilian versions producer and Distributor
 Betterman – Distributor
 Bikkuriman – Spanish version producer and Distributor
 Captain Tsubasa J – Spanish version producer and Distributor 
 Sakura Card Captors – Spanish and Brazilian versions producer and Distributor
 Cardcaptor Sakura: The Sealed Card – Spanish and Brazilian versions producer and Distributor
 Cooking Master Boy – Distributor (Unreleased)
 Crush Gear Turbo – Distributor (Unreleased)
 Cyber Cat Kurochan – Spanish version producer and Distributor 
 Detective Conan – Distributor
 Digimon Digital Monsters – Spanish and Brazilian versions producer and Distributor
 Digimon Digital Monsters 02 – Spanish and Brazilian versions producer and Distributor
 Digimon Digital Monsters 3 – Spanish and Brazilian versions producer and Distributor
 Digimon Season 4 – Spanish and Brazilian versions producer and Distributor
 DNA² – Distributor 
 Dr. Slump – Spanish version producer and Distributor
 New Dr. Slump – Spanish version producer and Distributor
 Dragon Ball – Spanish and Brazilian versions producer and Distributor
 Dragon Ball Z – Spanish and Brazilian versions producer and Distributor
 Dragon Ball GT – Spanish and Brazilian versions producer and Distributor
 Dragon Ball: Curse of the Blood Rubies – Spanish version producer and Distributor
 Dragon Ball: Sleeping Princess in Devil's Castle – Spanish version producer and Distributor
 Dragon Ball: Mystical Adventure – Spanish version producer and Distributor
 Dragon Ball: The Path to Power – Spanish version producer and Distributor
 Dragon Ball Z: Dead Zone – Spanish version producer and Distributor
 Dragon Ball Z: The World's Strongest – Spanish version producer and Distributor
 Dragon Ball Z: The Tree of Might – Spanish version producer and Distributor
 Dragon Ball Z: Lord Slug – Spanish version producer and Distributor
 Dragon Ball Z: Cooler's Revenge – Spanish version producer and Distributor
 Dragon Ball Z: Return of Cooler – Spanish version producer and Distributor
 Dragon Ball Z: Super Android 13 – Spanish version producer and Distributor
 Dragon Ball Z: Broly - The Legendary Super Saiyan – Spanish version producer and Distributor
 Dragon Ball Z: Bojack Unbound – Spanish version producer and Distributor
 Dragon Ball GT: A Hero's Legacy – Spanish version producer and Distributor
 Flone on the Marvelous Island (La Familia Robinson) – Distributor
 Full Metal Panic? Fumoffu – Spanish and Brazilian versions producer and Distributor (Licensed to Animax)
 Ge Ge Ge no Kitaro (1995 version) – Spanish version producer and Distributor
 GS Mikami – Spanish version co-producer and Distributor (Dub co-produced by )
 Gulliver Boy – Spanish version producer and Distributor
 Gundam Wing – Spanish and Brazilian versions producer and Distributor
 Gundam Wing: Endless Waltz – Spanish and Brazilian versions producer and Distributor
 Gungrave – Spanish and Brazilian versions producer and Distributor
 .hack//Sign – Distributor (Licensed to Animax)
 Heat Guy J – Spanish and Brazilian versions producer and Distributor
 Kinnikuman (First season) – Spanish version co-producer and Distributor (Dub co-produced by )
 Knights of the Zodiac (Los Caballeros del Zodiaco/Os Cavaleiros do Zodíaco) – Spanish and Brazilian versions producer and Distributor
 Love Hina – Spanish and Brazilian versions producer and Distributor
 Magic Knight Rayearth – Distributor
 Magical Doremi – Spanish version producer and Distributor
 Magical Doremi Sharp – Spanish version producer and Distributor
 Magical Doremi Forte – Distributor (Unreleased)
 Marmalade Boy – Spanish version co-producer and Distributor (Dub co-produced by )
 Nube – Spanish version producer and Distributor
 Peter Pan and Wendy – Distributor
 Ranma ½ – Spanish version co-producer and Distributor (Dub co-produced by )
 Ranma ½ – Brazilian version producer and Distributor
 Ranma ½ (First movie) – Spanish version producer and Distributor
 Ranma ½ (Second movie) – Spanish version producer and Distributor
 Rave Master – Spanish and Brazilian versions producer and Distributor
 Sailor Moon – Spanish and Brazilian versions producer and Distributor
 Sailor Moon R – Spanish and Brazilian versions producer and Distributor
 Sailor Moon R: The Movie – Spanish version producer and Distributor
 Sailor Moon S – English, Spanish and Brazilian versions producer and Distributor
 Sailor Moon S: The Movie – English and Spanish versions producer and Distributor
 Sailor Moon SuperS – English, Spanish and Brazilian versions producer and Distributor
 Sailor Moon SuperS: The Movie – English and Spanish versions producer and Distributor
 Sailor Moon Sailor Stars – Spanish and Brazilian versions producer and Distributor
 Sally the Witch (1989 version) – Spanish version producer and Distributor
 Samurai Champloo – Spanish and Brazilian versions producer and Distributor
 Slam Dunk – Spanish version producer and Distributor
 Tenchi Muyo! – Spanish version co-producer and Distributor (Dub co-produced by )
 Tenchi in Tokyo – Spanish version co-producer and Distributor (Dub co-produced by )
 Tenchi Muyo! Mihoshi Special – Spanish version co-producer and Distributor (Dub co-produced by )
 Tenchi Muyo! Ryo-Ohki – Spanish version co-producer and Distributor (Dub co-produced by )
 Tenchi Universe – Spanish version co-producer and Distributor (Dub co-produced by )
 Tico and Friends – Distributor
 Trigun – Spanish and Brazilian versions producer and Distributor
 Vandread – Distributor (As well as The Second Stage)
 Virtua Fighter – Distributor
 Yamato Takeru (Maxbot) – Distributor
 Yu Yu Hakusho: Ghost Files – Spanish and Brazilian versions producer and Distributor

Japanese live action
 Kamen Rider Kuuga
 Ultraman Tiga

See also
 Adness Entertainment LLC
 Toei Animation Inc.
 Viz Media LLC

References

External links
 Cloverway Inc. [archived]
 

Anime companies
Dubbing (filmmaking)
Companies based in Long Beach, California
Defunct companies based in Greater Los Angeles
Mass media companies established in 1991
Mass media companies disestablished in 2007
1991 establishments in California
2007 disestablishments in California
Defunct mass media companies of the United States